Hans Сhristian Friedrich Schmidt (born 26 August 1957) is a German politician of the centre-right Christian Social Union (CSU). He is the High Representative for Bosnia and Herzegovina, having assumed office on 1 August 2021.

Schmidt served as Minister of Food and Agriculture from 2014 until 2018. He was Parliamentary State Secretary in the German Federal Ministry of Defence from 2005 to 2013 and Parliamentary State Secretary in the German Federal Ministry of Economic Cooperation and Development from December 2013 until February 2014.
He was member of the Bundestag for Fürth from 1990 to 2021.

Early life and education
Schmidt attended the Georg-Willhem-Steller-Gymnasium in Bad Windsheim where he completed his Abitur in 1976. He then undertook mandatory military service in the 1st Mountain Division of the West German Army. He began legal studies in 1977 in Erlangen and Lausanne. Schmidt finished his legal studies with the successful completion of the required state examinations in 1982 and 1985. He was admitted to the bar in 1985 and practiced law until the assumption of his duties as Parliamentary State Secretary in November 2005.

Political career
As a student Schmidt joined the Junge Union (JU), the CSU youth group, in 1973. In 1976 he registered as a member of the CSU. From 1980–1982 he was chairman of the JU-District Association in Neustadt-an-der-Aisch. In 1982 he was named Chair of the JU-Regional Association for Central Franconia, a position that he held until 1991. From 1984 to 1990 Christian Schmidt was a town councillor in his hometown of Obernzenn and member of the District Council for Neustadt an der Aisch-Bad Windsheim.

From 1989 to 1993 Schmidt was also a member of the CSU State Committee, a post that he took up again in 1999. Since 1999, in addition to his duties on the CSU State Committee, Schmidt has been Chairman of the CSU-District Association in Fuerth.

Schmidt is the Chair of the CSU Regional Working Group on Foreign, Security and European Policy. Since May 2010 he has also served as Chair of the Regional Evangelical Working Group of the CSU. In May 2011 he was named Chair of the Federal Evangelical Working Group of the CSU/CDU.

Member of Parliament (1990–2021)

Schmidt was elected to the German Parliament, the Bundestag, in the 1990 elections. From 1991 to 2002 he was Chair of the national level CSU Working Group for Foreign, Defence and European policy. He then went on to serve as Chair of the CDU/CSU Parliamentary Defence Working Group. In this capacity he also served as the CDU/CSU spokesman for defence policy.

Schmidt served as Chair of the German-Israeli Parliamentary Friendship Group from 1994 until 1998 and as Chair for the German-British Parliamentary Friendship Group from 1998 until 2005. He has also been a member of the German-Baltic, German-Croatian, and German-Czech Parliamentary Friendship Groups. He was his parliamentary group's rapporteur on the German-Polish “Good Neighbour” Treaty in 1991, as well as the 1992 German-Czechoslovakia Treaty. In 1997 the Federal Minister of Defence selected Schmidt to serve on the Advisory Committee of the German-Czech Discussion Forum. 
 
He was rapporteur for the discussions pertaining to the Parliamentary Participation Act of 2005 dealing with the deployment of the German Bundeswehr within the Federal Republic.

Schmidt entered the German Parliament as a directly elected candidate, representing Fürth. In the 2009 elections he won 43.3% of the First Votes. In December 2012 he was nominated for the seventh time as the CSU candidate for the upcoming Federal Parliamentary Elections in 2013. The CSU Assembly of Delegates awarded him 98.7% of the vote (155 of 157 votes).

Parliamentary State Secretary in the Federal Ministry of Defence (2005–2013)

Schmidt was named Parliamentary State Secretary in the Federal Ministry of Defence by Chancellor Angela Merkel on 23 November 2005. In this capacity he served as parliamentary and political representative for three Ministers of the Defence; Franz Josef Jung, Karl-Theodor zu Guttenberg and Thomas de Maizière.

During his time in office Schmidt advanced the establishment of a foundation to care for service members negatively impacted by the side effects of radar signals encountered during their service. His time in office has seen several landmark events including  the investigation into the wartime activities of World War II German flying ace Werner Mölders (2007), the reorientation of the Federal Republic's armed forces (since 2010) and the resignation of Defence Minister zu Guttenberg in the wake of a plagiarism scandal (2011). Schmidt had defended zu Guttenberg against the accusations of plagiary. Schmidt also played an instrumental role in the establishment and financing of the “Hardship Fund” (Härtefall-Stiftung). This fund, maintained by the Soldiers’ Relief Association e.V., was founded in 2012 with the express remit of supporting soldiers seriously injured in the line of duty. The fund provides support above and beyond the standard duty of care laws in the Federal Republic, thereby serving as additional assistance for those veterans most in need.

Following the resignation of zu Guttenberg in 2011 Schmidt remained in office and was re-confirmed to the post by the new Minister for Defense, Thomas de Maiziere. In the negotiations to form a coalition government following the 2013 federal elections, he was part of the CDU/CSU delegation in the working group on foreign affairs, defense policy and development cooperation, led by de Maizière and Frank-Walter Steinmeier.

From 2011 until 2017 Schmidt had been serving as one of 5 deputy chairmen of the CSU, under the leadership of chairman Horst Seehofer. In this capacity, he was his party's spokesman on foreign and security policy, as well as on European politics. He was also responsible for the relationship of the CSU with other parties that are members of the European People's Party caucus (Christian Democrats) at the European Union level. He managed CSU international outreach to Israel, Croatia, Austria, the United States of America and the United Kingdom of Great Britain and Northern Ireland.

Federal Minister of Food and Agriculture (2014–2018)

From 2014 until 2018, Schmidt served as Federal Minister of Food and Agriculture in the third cabinet of Chancellor Angela Merkel.

In response to a 2016 collapse in milk prices, Schmidt rolled out an emergency package of at least €100 million for the country's dairy farmers, including loans and tax relief. Also during his time in office, Germany culled 776,000 farm chickens, turkeys, ducks and other types of poultry between November 2016 and January 2017 to combat bird flu.

In November 2017, Schmidt angered most politicians by breaking an agreement not to back a European Union proposal to extend the use of glyphosate for another five years, a measure opposed by Environment Minister Barbara Hendricks of the SPD, who had secured a guarantee of a non-positive vote just minutes before; it is usual practice that Germany abstains in EU votes if ministers from different governing parties disagree on a policy. Following the incident, Chancellor Merkel publicly scolded Schmidt, arguing that he should not have voted in favor against the wish of his colleague and in breach of government instructions. Schmidt's connections to the agricultural lobby have been part of criticism ever since.

Later career
Since leaving his government post, Schmidt has been serving on the Committee on Foreign Affairs and its Sub-Committee on the United Nations.

In 2019, Schmidt was appointed by the Federal Ministry of the Interior, Building and Community to serve on the committee that oversaw the preparations for the 30th anniversary of German reunification. 

In June 2021, he announced that he would not stand in the 2021 federal elections, but instead resign from active politics by the end of the parliamentary term.

High Representative for Bosnia and Herzegovina (2021–present)

In January 2021, the German government nominated Schmidt to be the new High Representative for Bosnia and Herzegovina. On 27 May 2021, Austrian diplomat Valentin Inzko resigned from his office of the High Representative, setting Schmidt to become the new High Representative on 1 August 2021. On 1 August, he officially became the new High Representative, succeeding Inzko. Russia had opposed Schmidt's appointment and refuses to recognise his authority.

In November 2021, Schmidt gave his first report to the United Nations secretary-general, warning that Bosnia and Herzegovina was in imminent danger of breaking apart with a possible return to conflict, and warned that if this happened, international military presence should be reviewed.

Schmidt imposed changes to Bosnia and Herzegovina's electoral law after voting hours ended for the 2022 general election. The changes prominently included an expansion of the Federal House of Peoples from 56 to 80 members, changes in the election process for the house as well as changes in the election process for the president and vice presidents of the Federation of Bosnia and Herzegovina. An earlier draft of election law changes that leaked in July was met with protests in the capital Sarajevo. The draft was also criticised by Bisera Turković, the Foreign Minister of Bosnia and Herzegovina and the Iranian embassy, claiming it "consolidates the ethnic divisions". The changes received support from the United States and the United Kingdom embassies.

Political positions
In August 2012, Schmidt was one of 124 members of the Bundestag to sign a letter that was sent to the Russian ambassador to Germany, Vladimir Grinin, expressing concern over the trial against the three members of Pussy Riot. “Being held in detention for months and the threat of lengthy punishment are draconian and disproportionate,” the lawmakers said in the letter. “In a secular and pluralist state, peaceful artistic acts -- even if they can be seen as provocative -- must not lead to the accusation of serious criminal acts that lead to lengthy prison terms.”

Other activities

Corporate boards
Deutsche Bahn, Member of the Supervisory Board (since 2018)
KfW, Member of the Supervisory Board (2014–2018)
Landwirtschaftliche Rentenbank, Deputy Chairman of the Supervisory Board (2014–2018)

Non-profit organizations
Leo Baeck Foundation, Member of the Board of Trustees
Society for Defense and Security Policy (GfW), Member of the Board of Trustees
German Atlantic Society, President (since 2006)
Society for Christian-Jewish Cooperation, Co-Chairman (since 2013)  
German Council on Foreign Relations (DGAP), Chairman of the Czech Republic Discussion Group
Coordination Council for German-Czech Dialogue, Member of the Board
Foundation for the Examination of the Dictatorship in East Germany, Member of the Board of Trustees
American Jewish Committee in Berlin, Member of the Advisory Board
Hanns Seidel Foundation, Deputy Chairman of the Board
Help for Self-Help e.V., Honorary Member of the Board 
Comrades Association of Alpine Troops in Munich, Member
German Foundation for Peace Research (DSF), Ex-Officio Member of the Board of Trustees (2009–2013)
Centre for International Peace Operations (ZIF), Ex-Officio Member of the Supervisory Board (2009–2013)
Car and Travel Club Germany (ARCD), Member of the Presidium (1993–2007)
Free World Commission, Scowcroft Center for Strategy and Security (Atlantic Council), Member (2020–)

Recognition
2004 – Commander of the Order of Three Stars for the Republic of Latvia
2005 – Commander for the Order of Merit for the Republic of Lithuania 
2005 – Cross of the Order of Merit for the Federal Republic of Germany
2007 – Bavarian Distinguished Service Award
2012 – Honourable Accolade of the First Degree for National Defence, Hungary
2013 – Order of Ante Starčević, Croatia

Footnotes

References

News sites

External links

1957 births
Living people
People from Neustadt (Aisch)-Bad Windsheim
Agriculture ministers of Germany
Articles containing video clips
Government ministers of Germany
Members of the Bundestag for Bavaria
Recipients of the Cross of the Order of Merit of the Federal Republic of Germany
Members of the Bundestag 2017–2021
Members of the Bundestag 2013–2017
Members of the Bundestag 2009–2013
Members of the Bundestag 2005–2009
Members of the Bundestag 2002–2005
Members of the Bundestag 1998–2002
Members of the Bundestag 1994–1998
Members of the Bundestag for the Christian Social Union in Bavaria
High Representatives for Bosnia and Herzegovina